Kingdom of Armenia may refer to:
Kingdom of Armenia (antiquity), also known as Artaxiad or Arsacid Armenia, 380 BC to AD 387/428
Kingdom of Armenia (Middle Ages), also known as Bagratid Armenia, AD 885 to 1045

Other ancient Armenian kingdoms
Kingdom of Ararat also known as Urartu
Satrapy of Armenia, also known as Orontid Armenia
Kingdom of Sophene
Kingdom of Commagene
Lesser Armenia
Armenian Kingdom of Cilicia, 1198 to 1375
Kingdom of Vaspurakan
Kingdom of Artsakh
Zakarid Armenia

See also
History of Armenia
Greater Armenia